The International Workshop on Nitride Semiconductors (IWN) is a biennial academic conference in the field of group III nitride research. The IWN and the International Conference on Nitride Semiconductors (ICNS) are held in alternating years and cover similar subject areas. IWN is pioneered by Isamu Akasaki (Nagoya University, Meijo University) and Hiroshi Amano (Nagoya University), who are Nobel laureates in physics (2014)

- IWN2018 was held 11–16 November 2018 in Kanazawa, Japan, and chaired by Hiroshi Fujioka (the University of Tokyo, Japan)

- IWN2016 was held 2–7 October 2016 in Orlando, United States, and jointly chaired by Alan Doolittle (Georgia Institute of Technology and Tomas Palacios (Massachusetts Institute of Technology, USA)

- IWN2012 was held 14–19 October 2012 in Sapporo, Japan and chaired by Hiroshi Amano (Nagoya University, Japan).

Conference list

See also 
 Gallium nitride
 Indium nitride
 Aluminium nitride
 Boron nitride

References 

Physics conferences
Technology conferences